Timothy (Tim) David Piper is an Australian writer and director.  Working for Ogilvy & Mather Toronto, Piper helped create Dove's "Evolution" television commercial.
For this, Piper was one of Time Magazine's finalists for being in its 2008 TIME 100 list for his work for Dove's.

In 2013 he gained widespread attention for creating a viral video showing his wife, actress Sally Gifford Piper as a model, having her appearance radically transformed by Photoshop.
In 2014, Tim Piper and Daniel Rosenberg worked to create, write, and produce Farmed and Dangerous, a four-part webisode comedy series, which his wife also appeared in.

References

External links

1972 births
Living people
Australian directors